Casphalia is a moth genus in the family Limacodidae.

Species
Casphalia citrimaculata Aurivillius 1905
Casphalia elegans Jordan 1915
Casphalia elongata Jordan 1915
Casphalia extranea Walker 1869
Casphalia flavicollis Walker 1866
Casphalia nigerrima Holland, 1893
Casphalia nigridorsa Aurivillius 1905
Casphalia picta Schaus & Clements 1893

References

External links 

Limacodidae genera
Limacodinae
Taxa named by Francis Walker (entomologist)